José Carlos Castanho de Almeida (14 June 1930 – 27 February 2022) was a Brazilian Roman Catholic prelate.

Castanho de Almeida was born in Guareí, Brazil, and was ordained to the priesthood in 1953. He served as titular bishop of 'Urusi' and as auxiliary bishop of the Roman Catholic Diocese of Santos, Brazil, from 1982 to 1987. He then served as bishop of the Roman Catholic Diocese of Itumbiara, Brazil, from 1987 to 1994 and as bishop of the Roman Catholic Diocese of Araçatuba, Brazil, from 1994 until his resignation in 2003. Castanho de Almeida died in Sorocaba on 27 February 2022, at the age of 91.

References

1930 births
2022 deaths
20th-century Roman Catholic bishops in Brazil
21st-century Roman Catholic bishops in Brazil
Roman Catholic bishops of Itumbiara
People from São Paulo (state)